Shoba Narayan is an Indian author, journalist and columnist. She wrote the award-winning Monsoon Diary: A Memoir with Recipes (2003). She is the author of four books.

Biography 
She received her Bachelor of Science in Psychology from Women's Christian College. She studied fine arts as a Foreign Fellow at Mount Holyoke College and received a Master of Arts from the Columbia University Graduate School of Journalism.

She has published four books. She contributes to a regular column for the Hindustan Times Brunch magazine. She has previously contributed to Indian financial daily, Mint and Abu Dhabi daily, The National.

Bibliography 
The Milk Lady of Bangalore: an unexpected adventure
Katha: Tell a Story; Sell a Dream (the Art of Corporate Storytelling)
Monsoon Diary: a memoir with recipes
Return to India: an immigrant memoir

Awards 
She was awarded the M.F.K. Fisher Award for Distinguished Writing in 2001.

References

External links 
Official Website
Interview

Living people
Mount Holyoke College alumni
Columbia University Graduate School of Journalism alumni
21st-century Indian women writers
Year of birth missing (living people)
Women's Christian College, Chennai alumni
James Beard Foundation Award winners
21st-century Indian non-fiction writers
21st-century Indian journalists
Indian women non-fiction writers
Indian women journalists
Indian memoirists
Indian women memoirists
21st-century memoirists